The  was a railway accident that occurred in Shigaraki (now Koka), Shiga Prefecture, Japan on May 14, 1991. A Shigaraki Kōgen Railway (SKR) train and a West Japan Railway Company (JR West) train collided head-on, killing 42 people and injuring 614 others. Until the Amagasaki rail crash in 2005, this was the deadliest railway disaster in Japan since the Yokohama rail crash of 1963, which killed 161 people.

Accident
The accident happened at 10:35 (1:35 UTC) local time on May 14, 1991, on the SKR Shigaraki Line between Onotani Signal Station and Shigarakigūshi. 

A special JR West rapid service train (501D) from Kyoto bound for Shigaraki had entered the Shigaraki Line at Kibukawa Station from the Kusatsu Line, transporting 716 passengers to the World Ceramic Festival that was being held in Shigaraki at the time.

Going in the opposite direction, an SKR local train (534D) had left Shigaraki and headed for Kibukawa, despite a red signal. 

The  was the only point on the single-track line where two trains can safely pass, but the JR West train had already gone past that signal station, as it was given a green signal despite the approaching SKR train. The signal station has been deactivated since the disaster.

Causes 

The primary causes of the accidents were SKR officials allowing the eastbound SKR train to pass red signals and the failed interlocking that allowed the westbound JR West train to advance past Onotani Signal Station. Both SKR and JR West had independently made unauthorized modification to the signal system, which led to the confusion that prompted the SKR staff to send a train against a red signal, and the faulty wiring that showed the JR West train a green signal, when the approaching SKR train should have turned the signal to red.

Aftermath

SKR suspended passenger service while the Shiga Prefecture and Ministry of Transport conducted investigations, and service did not reopen until December 1991. When service resumed, the use of Onotani Signal Station as a passing point was discontinued. As a result, service frequency was reduced from twice an hour to once an hour, with operation in only one direction at any time. 

In 1999, the two companies have had a complaint set against them for having negligence for the victims of the train disaster. In the same year, the two companies were put on trial in the Ōtsu District Court. In 2002, in the Osaka High Court, the West Japan Railway Company was found guilty of negligence. The West Japan Railway Company however did not appeal against the verdict of the High Court.

JR West discontinued through train operations to the Shigaraki Line, while other Japan Railways Group companies similarly discontinued non-regular through train operations to private and Third Sector railway lines. 

The World Ceramic Festival, which was to continue until May 26, was cancelled the day following the accident.

See also
 Lists of rail accidents

References 

Train collisions in Japan
Railway accidents in 1991
1991 in Japan
Rail transport in Shiga Prefecture
Railway accidents involving a signal passed at danger
May 1991 events in Asia
1991 disasters in Japan